The Atkinson County School District is a public school district in Atkinson County, Georgia, United States, based in Pearson. It serves the communities of Pearson and Willacoochee.

Schools
The Atkinson County School District has two elementary schools, one middle school, and one high school.

Elementary schools 
Pearson Elementary School
 Willacoochee Elementary School

Middle school 
 Atkinson County Middle School

High school
 Atkinson County High School

References

External links
 

School districts in Georgia (U.S. state)
Education in Atkinson County, Georgia